Time Machine is an unfinished Bollywood science-fiction film which was in production in 1992 and was directed by Shekhar Kapur. The film's cast included Aamir Khan, Rekha, Naseeruddin Shah, Raveena Tandon, Gulshan Grover and Vijay Anand. After three-fourths of the film's shooting was completed, it was shelved due to financial constraints and Kapur's departure to the U.S. In 2008, Shekhar Kapur announced he would attempt to revive the film with a new cast but this never materialised.

Plot
The film was said to be based on the Hollywood hit time-travel film Back to the Future. Aamir Khan was to play the leading character who goes back in time from the 1990s to the 1960s and meets his parents (played by Naseeruddin Shah & Rekha) before they ever met. Vijay Anand was cast as the scientist who invents the time machine. Raveena Tandon was cast as the love interest. Gulshan Grover and Amrish Puri were cast in other roles. It also credited that H.G. Wells’s book The Time Machine was also influential to the movie.https://www.imdb.com/name/nm0920229/otherworks?ref =nm pdt wrk sm

References

1990s unfinished films
Indian science fiction films
1990s Hindi-language films
Unreleased Hindi-language films